Miladin is a masculine given name. It may refer to:

Miladin Bečanović (born 1973), footballer
Miladin Kozlina (born 1983), handball player
Miladin Peković (born 1983), basketball player
Miladin Pešterac (1960–2007), footballer
Miladin Popović (1910–1945), politician
Miladin "Dado" Pršo (born 1974), retired footballer
Miladin Stevanović (born 1996), footballer
Miladin Šobić (born 1956), singer
Miladin Zarić (1889–1976), teacher and soldier

See also
Miladinović
Miladinovtsi
Miladinovci

Slavic masculine given names
Serbian masculine given names
Bulgarian masculine given names